Nigamatovo (Niğämät) is a rural locality (a selo) and the administrative centre of Nigamatovsky Selsoviet, Baymaksky District, Bashkortostan, Russia. The population was 838 as of 2010. There are 10 streets.

Geography 
Nigamatovo is located 30 km northwest of Baymak (the district's administrative centre) by road. Nizhneyaikbayevo is the nearest rural locality.

References 

Rural localities in Baymaksky District